Maurer AG#Roller_coasters − German Roller coaster
 GM X platform − General Motors automobiles
 XCar: Experimental Racing - 1997 racing video game